Peri Schwartz (October 4, 1951 – May 7, 2021) was an American painter and printmaker. Her work is held in major museums worldwide.

Life and work
Peri Schwartz was born in Brooklyn, New York, and raised in Far Rockaway, New York. She received her BFA from Boston University College of Fine Arts in 1973 and an MFA from Queens College in 1975.

Schwartz's early career concentrated on painting and drawing traditional self-portraits, portraits, and still lifes. In the early 2000s, she began to focus more on her studio as subject. Her works, many of objects from her studio such as tables, books, and paint jars, display prominent angles, shapes and lines. To guide her compositions, Schwartz centered and organized her work on a grid system. In her completed paintings, faint grid lines weave throughout though varied rather than rigid so the work is formal but not stiff.

Schwartz began exhibiting in the United States in the 1990s.

Schwartz lived and worked in New Rochelle, New York. Schwartz passed away on May 7, 2021, in White Plains, New York, at the age of 69.

Selected collections
 Albertina, Vienna, Austria
 Ashmolean Museum, Oxford, UK
 Bibliotheque Nationale de France, Paris, France
 British Museum, London, UK
 Fogg Museum, Cambridge, MA
 Library of Congress, Washington, DC
 Los Angeles Museum of Art
 Metropolitan Museum of Art, New York, NY
 Museum of Fine Arts, Boston, MA
 New York Public Library, New York, NY
 Staatliche Museum, Berlin, Germany
 Yale University Art Gallery, New Haven, CT

Selected exhibitions
 2020  Paintings & Works on Paper, Page Bond Gallery, Richmond, VA
 2019  Form + Color, Gerald Peters Gallery, Santa Fe, NM
 2018  Color & Process, Gallery NAGA, Boston, MA
 2017	In the Studio, Murray State University, Murray, KT
 2016  Constructing From Life, Page Bond Gallery, Richmond, VA 
 2015  Paintings • Drawings • Prints, University of Mississippi Museum, Oxford, MS
 2014  Composing Paintings, Gallery NAGA, Boston, MA 
 2013  New Watercolors and Drawings, Garvey/Simon Art Access, New York, NY 
 2013	Dwellings, Gerald Peters Gallery, Santa Fe, NM 
 2012	Compositions, Page Bond Gallery, Richmond, VA 
 2010  Color Prints, Abbott and Holder, London, UK  
 2009 	Reflections, Hillwood Art Museum, Brookville, NY 
 2008 	Objects Considered, Midday Gallery, Englewood, NJ 
 2007 	Recent Work, Page Bond Gallery, Richmond, VA 
 2006 	Studio Paintings, Reeves Contemporary, New York, NY

See also
 Portrait painting 
 Self-portrait
 Still life

References

External links
 Official website

1951 births
Living people
Artists from Brooklyn
20th-century American painters
Boston University College of Fine Arts alumni
Queens College, City University of New York alumni
20th-century American women artists
21st-century American women artists